Umbumbulu is a town in the eThekwini Metropolitan Municipality in the KwaZulu-Natal province of South Africa.

The township lies near the junction of Highway M30 and R603 about 45 km south-west of Durban and 19 km from the Indian Ocean. Derived from Zulu, the name is said to mean place of the round knoll. Umbumbulu is a rural area, bordered by Madundube on the north-east, and the farming community of Mid-Illovo on the south. In the 1970s and 1980s it was a scene of a local conflict, which saw hundreds murdered, and thousands dislocated. It has since become a picture of serene rural living.

The main river running through Umbumbulu is the Ntinyane River, and it is infamous as the site where a clergyman was swept away by the floods in the 1980s, his body never retrieved to this day.

References

Populated places in eThekwini Metropolitan Municipality
Townships in KwaZulu-Natal